Brynäs IF is a Swedish football club located in Gävle.

Background
Brynäs Idrottsförening was formed in 1912 and has played one season in the highest Swedish division, Allsvenskan (1974). The club won the Swedish Championship in 1925. Brynäs IF merged with Gefle IF and played under the name Gefle IF/Brynäs between the 1979 and 1981 seasons, but the merger was split up in 1982. Brynäs IF FK are affiliated to the Gestriklands Fotbollförbund.

Achievements
 Swedish Champions
 Winners (1): 1925

Cups
Svenska Mästerskapet:
Winners: 1925

Season to season

In their early years Brynäs IF competed in the following divisions:

In the 1960s and 1970s Brynäs IF had their most successful period and competed in the following divisions:

In recent seasons Brynäs IF have competed in the following divisions:

Attendances

In recent seasons IK Tord have had the following average attendances:

Footnotes
A. The title of "Swedish Champions" has been awarded to the winner of four different competitions over the years. Between 1896 and 1925 the title was awarded to the winner of Svenska Mästerskapet, a stand-alone cup tournament. No club were given the title between 1926 and 1930 even though the first-tier league Allsvenskan was played. In 1931 the title was reinstated and awarded to the winner of Allsvenskan. Between 1982 and 1990 a play-off in cup format was held at the end of the league season to decide the champions. After the play-off format in 1991 and 1992 the title was decided by the winner of Mästerskapsserien, an additional league after the end of Allsvenskan. Since the 1993 season the title has once again been awarded to the winner of Allsvenskan.

Footnotes

External links
Official site 

 
Allsvenskan clubs
Association football clubs established in 1912
Sport in Gävle
1912 establishments in Sweden